Provincial road N703 (N703) is a road connecting N702 with Rijksweg 6 (A6) in Almere.

External links

703
703